"Where the Lost Ones Go" is a single from Norwegian singer Sissel's All Good Things album, released in 2001 (See 2001 in music). It is a duet with Espen Lind, written by Lind and Magnus Rostadmo. It also appeared on Espen Lind's This Is Pop Music album.

Track listing 

 "Where the Lost Ones Go"
 "One Day"
 "He's a Lot"
 "Where the Lost Ones Go" (Instrumental)

Chart positions 
The single spent five weeks on the Netherlands charts.

Sarah Brightman version

"I Will Be with You (Where the Lost Ones Go)" is a duet by Sarah Brightman and Chris Thompson; Written by Espen Lind, Magnus Rostadmo and Amund Bjorklund. The single was released on July 16, 2007 (See 2007 in music). The song was used as the official theme song for the Japanese version of the tenth Pokémon film The Rise of Darkrai. It was also used in her Symphony concert DVD.

The album version of the song, featuring Paul Stanley of KISS in place of Thompson, can be found on Symphony. "I Will Be with You (Where the Lost Ones Go)" is the second duet between Brightman and Thompson; the first being "How Can Heaven Love Me" which featured on Brightman's album Fly.

The Polish edition of the album features the song as a duet with Andrzej Lampert; again the song is the same, but with new male vocal. It was the first time that Brightman agreed to record a bonus track with a local artist.

There is also a Russian version recorded with Sergey Penkin.

Track listing 
 "I Will Be with You (Where the Lost Ones Go)" (Movie version) - 4:34
 "I Will Be with You (Where the Lost Ones Go)" (Movie version) (Instrumental) - 4:34

Charts

Other covers 
Garðar Thór Cortes covered the song on the UK version of his album, Cortes, featuring Katherine Jenkins.

References 

2001 singles
2007 singles
2001 songs
Sissel Kyrkjebø songs
Sarah Brightman songs
Songs written by Espen Lind
Universal Records singles